was a Japanese football player. He played for Japan national team.

Club career
Sato was born in Amagasaki on February 5, 1932. After graduating from Kwansei Gakuin University, he played for Kwangaku Club was consisted of his alma mater Kwansei Gakuin University players and graduates. He won 1955, 1958 and 1959 Emperor's Cup.

National team career
On January 2, 1955, when Sato was a Kwansei Gakuin University student, he debuted for Japan national team against Burma. In 1956, he was selected Japan for 1956 Summer Olympics in Melbourne. He also played at 1958 Asian Games. He played 15 games for Japan until 1959.

Sato died on January 1, 1988, at the age of 55.

National team statistics

References

External links
 
 Japan National Football Team Database

1932 births
1988 deaths
Kwansei Gakuin University alumni
Association football people from Hyōgo Prefecture
Japanese footballers
Japan international footballers
Olympic footballers of Japan
Footballers at the 1956 Summer Olympics
Footballers at the 1958 Asian Games
Association football midfielders
Asian Games competitors for Japan